Miyuki Takahashi (高橋 みゆき Takahashi Miyuki, born 25 December 1978) is a Japanese volleyball player who plays for the NEC Red Rockets.
Miyuki Takahashi also plays for the All-Japan women's volleyball team and participated at the 2004 and 2008 Summer Olympics. Her nickname is SHIN (心 Shin).
She was the captain of the Japanese volleyball team during the Volleyball World Championship.

Clubs
  Yamagata Higashi Jr.
  NEC Red Rockets (1997–2005)
  Minetti Infoplus Vicenza (2005–2007)
  NEC Red Rockets (2007–2009)
  Toyota Auto Body Queenseis (2011-current)

National team
2001: Bronze Medal in the World Grand Champions Cup 2001
2002: 13th place in the World Championship 2002
2003: 5th place in the World Cup 2003
2004: 5th place in the Olympic Games of Athens
2006: 6th place in the World Championship 2006
2007: 7th place in the World Cup 2007
2008: 5th place in the Olympic Games of Beijing

Individual awards
 2004 Olympic Qualifier "Best Spiker"
 2005 FIVB World Grand Prix "Best Scorer"
 Best Server (World Grand Champion Cup 2001)

References

External links
 FIVB biography

Volleyball players at the 2008 Summer Olympics
1978 births
Japanese women's volleyball players
Living people
People from Yamagata Prefecture
Volleyball players at the 2004 Summer Olympics
Olympic volleyball players of Japan
NEC Red Rockets players
Asian Games medalists in volleyball
Volleyball players at the 2002 Asian Games
Volleyball players at the 2006 Asian Games
Asian Games silver medalists for Japan
Asian Games bronze medalists for Japan
Medalists at the 2002 Asian Games
Medalists at the 2006 Asian Games